The 2017 SBS Entertainment Awards presented by Seoul Broadcasting System (SBS), took place on December 30, 2017 at SBS Prism Tower in Sangam-dong, Mapo-gu, Seoul. It was hosted by Jun Hyun-moo, Choo Ja-hyun and Lee Sang-min. The nominees were chosen from SBS variety, talk and comedy shows that aired from December 2016 to November 2017.

Nominations and winners

Presenters

Special performances

References

External links 

Seoul Broadcasting System original programming
SBS Entertainment Awards
2017 television awards
2017 in South Korea